The Great Contract was a plan submitted to James I and Parliament in 1610 by Robert Cecil. It was an attempt to increase Crown income and ultimately rid it of debt.

Cecil suggested that, in return for an annual grant of £200,000, the Crown should give up its feudal rights of Wardship and Purveyance, as well as the power of creating new impositions. The plan was eventually rejected by both James and Parliament: the failure of his cherished project was thought by some to have hastened Cecil's early death in 1612, although it is most likely that he died of cancer. The King withdrew from the contract because it meant that he would lose a useful means of controlling his more powerful subjects, and he also did not think £200,000 was a worthy substitute for his feudal rights. The House of Commons withdrew because they were wary of providing an income that might give the King financial independence.

Whether it would have helped the financial situation remains a matter of speculation. It has been argued that the financial settlement at the Restoration of Charles II was partly inspired by the Great Contract. On the other hand, James I was rather extravagant in financial matters, and it is uncertain whether the Contract would have been a permanent solution to his difficulties. It is also important to consider how, at the point of Elizabeth's death, the Crown was £400,000 in debt, considering that Elizabeth ran a rather frugal court and was careful with money, and thus the financial problems of James' reign were not all of his own making. Furthermore, it must also be said that James, who had a wife and, by 1605, four children to support, had many legitimate expenses which the unmarried and childless Elizabeth did not.

See also
Tenures Abolition Act 1660

References
Kenyon, J.P.  The Stuarts  Fontana edition 1966

Stuart England
1610 in England
Parliament of England
1610 in politics
Taxation in England
Public finance of England
History of government debt
Feudalism in England
James VI and I